Lieutenant Harriet Beaumont Sims-Roberts, USN (played by Karri Turner) is a fictional character in the JAG TV series. She made her first appearance in Season 2.

Background
Sims comes from a Southern "old money" family and faced some prejudice when she joined the Navy. Her mother is particularly displeased with her career choice and decision to marry "a man named after a dog" – namely, Bud.

Career
Sims is promoted twice during the series, first in the fourth season episode to Lieutenant Junior Grade after two years as an Ensign, then to Lieutenant in the sixth season.

Harriet Sims first appears in the second season as an ensign aboard the Nimitz-class aircraft carrier USS Seahawk, replacing her future husband, Lt. Bud Roberts, as a public affairs officer. Later in the season, she transferred to JAG headquarters in Falls Church, Virginia, attached to the administrative staff, and began a relationship with Roberts. Despite some last-minute second thoughts, Sims marries Roberts in the penultimate episode of the third season. While Navy regulations strictly prohibit fraternization, Admiral Chegwidden manages to pull some strings and has Sims transferred to the Office of the Naval Inspector General while remaining attached to the JAG headquarters administrative staff.

Family
Sims and Roberts have had five children together:
 A.J. (named in the honor of RAdm A.J. Chegwidden, however not taking his proper first names Albert Jethro.)
 Sarah (named in the honor of Lt.Col Sarah MacKenzie. Unfortunately, the child died shortly after birth.)
 James Kirk (named in the honor of Capt James T. Kirk since Roberts was a big "Star Trek" fan.)
 Unnamed twins (a boy and a girl) born towards the end of the series (girl is called Nikki in one episode).

In the final episode of the ninth season, Sims announces she is pregnant with twins and is having her commission in the Navy sent to an inactive reserve billet, so she can stay home and raise her growing family. Although she, in essence, resigns her commission, she is still seen for the rest of the series.

Awards and decorations

In Order of Precedence

Between episodes S05E01 and S08E10, Lt. Sims mistakenly wore the Naval Reserve Medal. That medal was awarded for 10 years of honorable service in the Naval Reserve, and it was discontinued in 1958.

References

JAG (TV series) characters
Fictional Judge Advocate General's Corps (United States) personnel
Television characters introduced in 1997
Fictional United States Navy officers
Fictional ensigns
Fictional lieutenants